Manuel Peretti (born 7 March 2000) is an Italian professional footballer who plays as a centre-back for  club Recanatese, on loan from Palermo.

Club career 
A Hellas Verona youth product, he was signed on loan by then-Serie D side Palermo on August 2019 as one of the first acquisitions by the refounded Rosanero club.

Peretti played 14 games for the Rosanero in the 2019–20 Serie D season that was cut short due to the COVID-19 pandemic in Italy. Palermo successively signed him permanently following the club's promotion to Serie C, with a buy-back option for Hellas Verona.

On 31 January 2022, he was loaned out to Serie C club Grosseto until the end of the 2021–22 season.

On 4 January 2023, he was loaned out to Serie C club Recanatese until the end of the 2022–23 season.

Career statistics

Club

References

2000 births
Living people
Italian footballers
Association football central defenders
Palermo F.C. players
U.S. Grosseto 1912 players
U.S.D. Recanatese 1923 players
Serie D players
Serie C players